69th Regiment may refer to:

 69th (South Lincolnshire) Regiment of Foot, an infantry regiment of the British Army
 69th Armor Regiment, an armoured unit of the US Army
 69th Infantry Regiment (United States), an infantry unit of the US Army
 69th Infantry Regiment (New York), an infantry unit of the US Army

American Civil war
 69th Illinois Volunteer Infantry Regiment, Union Army
 69th Indiana Infantry Regiment, Union Army
 69th Ohio Infantry, Union Army
 69th Pennsylvania Infantry, Union Army

See also
 69th Division (disambiguation)